Ypsolopha parallela is a moth of the family Ypsolophidae. It is known from Japan, Korea, China and Russia.

The wingspan is 20–24 mm.

The larvae feed on Quercus serrata.

References

Ypsolophidae
Moths of Asia